Social prescribing (also known as community referral) is when health professionals refer patients to support in the community, in order to improve their health and wellbeing. The concept has gained support in the NHS organisations of the United Kingdom as well as in Ireland and the Netherlands and forms part of the NHS Long Term Plan. The referral mechanisms, target groups, services offered through social prescribing vary across settings. However, the process usually involves screening for non-medical needs and referrals to support services that are typically offered by community-based organizations. 

The goals of social prescribing are to reduce the rise of healthcare costs and easing pressure of general practice clinics. A 2015 Commission in the UK estimated that about 20% of patient consultations were for social problems rather than medical problems.

Definition 
Social prescribing is a non-medical referral option for a range of professionals, including GPs and allied medical staff, as well as non-medical professionals working in the social care and charity sectors. People can also self-refer for support in many areas. Doctors can refer some of their patients to a social prescribing specialist or link worker who can then suggest local social groups which they can participate in to improve their health and wellbeing. These may include social enterprises, community businesses and local volunteer groups.

Evaluation 
A 2016 review in The BMJ concluded that further, more robust testing was needed to determine how effective it was, noting that evidence in favour of social prescription came from small trials that were open to a range of biases. A study of social prescription programs at 23 GP surgeries in central London found it produced a strong improvement in qualitative outcomes such as making participants less isolated, while quantitative outcomes such as general health and wellbeing were largely unchanged.

A 2020 review found that social prescribing can help people develop a sense of belonging and confidence. But for this to happen, link workers need the resources to develop extensive knowledge of local organisations and services. They also need to have enough time to build a relationship with their patients.

In the London borough of Merton, a review found that in ‘pre COVID’ times social prescribing reduced patients’ GP appointments by 33% and A&E 
attendances by 50%. Their wellbeing scores improved by 77%. Five other studies looked at the effect on Accident and Emergency (A&E) attendances reporting an average 24% fall in attendance following referral.

Examples 
In Brighton and Hove, pilot funding was provided in 2014 for a Community Navigator scheme. The pilot involved placing volunteer navigators in 16 of Brighton’s 36 GP surgeries. In recognition of the programme’s success, the local CCG took over funding the scheme when the pilot ended in 2016. The provider, Together Co, has been held up as an example of good practice for its provision of social prescribing and for running a link worker network in the city so that staff at a range of organisations can benefit from ongoing learning and development.

Resources 
A National Academy for Social Prescribing was established in the UK. There is also a National Association of Link Workers, which aims to support social prescribing staff, to lobby for improvements, and to provide guidance and continuing professional development to members.

Healthy London Partnership has produced a report intended to help CCG commissioners make decisions about implementing social prescribing and are also hosting a wiki specifically on Social Prescribing and Self Care.

Conclusions 
Social prescribing is a logical extension of the biopsychosocial model of healthcare. There are several theoretical and practical factors in favor of this scheme.  Therefore, the momentum for social prescribing is likely to be sustained, even with the lack of evidence to support its growth. This scheme presents an approach for expanding the avenue of social care for the patients. However, it will only see success when healthcare professionals fully accept it as a useful mechanism for improving the overall health and wellbeing of their patients.

See also
 College of Medicine (UK)
 Michael Dixon (doctor)
 West Wakefield Health and Wellbeing Ltd

References 

General practice
Medical terminology
Patient advocacy